This is a list of Florida A&M Rattlers in the NFL Draft. In total Florida A&M has had 66 players drafted since 1953.

Key

Selections

References

Florida A&M Rattlers

Florida A&M Rattlers NFL Draft